Hughes Davies Price (29 July 1908 – 14 March 1995) was an Australian rules footballer who played with North Melbourne and St Kilda in the Victorian Football League (VFL).

Price later served in the Royal Australian Navy during World War II.

Notes

External links 

1908 births
1995 deaths
Australian rules footballers from Victoria (Australia)
North Melbourne Football Club players
St Kilda Football Club players